Gustavo Turecki (born May 11, 1965) is a Canadian psychiatrist, suicidologist, neuroscientist who is a professor at McGill University in Montreal, Quebec, Canada. He holds a Tier 1 Canada Research Chair Tier in Major Depressive Disorder and Suicide. He is the sitting Chair of the Department of Psychiatry at McGill University, the Scientific Director of the Douglas Research Centre, and the Psychiatrist-in-Chief of the Centre intégré universitaire de santé et de services sociaux de l’Ouest-de-l’Île-de-Montréal (CIUSSS ODIM). He works at the Douglas Mental Health University Institute, where he heads both the McGill Group for Suicide Studies and the Depressive Disorders Program, and is the co-director of the Douglas Bell-Canada Brain Bank.

Turecki is both a clinician and a neuroscientist. He has published over 500 peer-reviewed publications and 30 book chapters examining the influence of life experiences on brain function and their relationship to depression and suicide risk. One of his major contributions is the first description of the long-term impact of childhood abuse on the brain, particularly how it affects the activity of key genes involved in the stress response.

Scientific contributions 
Turecki's neurobiological work has focused on the processes underlying depression and suicide. In collaboration with Michael Meaney and Moshe Szyf, Turecki uncovered that early-life adversity epigenetically regulates the glucocorticoid receptor gene, a key component of response to stress. This study helped to reconcile debate about the relative influences of genes and environment on behaviour (‘nature vs. nurture’ debate), and led to Turecki's selection as the scientist of the year by Radio Canada/Canadian Broadcasting Corporation in 2009, along with Meaney and Szyf. Turecki's further research on the human brain explored the epigenetic control of genes related to stress-response systems, such as the hypothalamic-pituitary-adrenal (HPA) axis, particularly in association with childhood abuse and suicide. The results obtained in studying the epigenetic control of the HPA axis prompted Turecki to expand his interest in the epigenetic regulation of the brain, focusing on mechanisms that may explain what happens when individuals are exposed to traumatic experiences early in their lives, as well as what epigenetic processes are involved in depression and suicide. In addition, his work has focused on epigenetic mechanisms explaining response to antidepressants.

Turecki leads the Depressive Disorders Program, a clinical group that treats patients affected with major depression and integrates research projects into clinical practice. Two key aspects of this work are exploring how impulsive-aggressive behaviours contribute to suicide risk, and implementing novel protocols and standards in the field.

Personal life
Turecki is married and has three children. He was born in La Plata, Argentina and moved to Montreal, Canada in 1994.

Awards and honours 
Turecki is a fellow of the Canadian Academy of Health Sciences and of the American College of Neuropsychopharmacology.

 2005	William Dawson Scholar, McGill University
 2009	Scientist of the year Award, Radio Canada/CBC
 2009	Top 10 findings of the year, Québec Science
 2012	Heinz Lehmann Award, CCNP
 2012	Research Career Award, American Foundation for Suicide Prevention
 2014	Samarthji Lal Award for Mental Health Research, Graham Boeck Foundation
 2014	Top 10 findings of the year, Québec Science
 2015	Joel Elkes Award for Clinical Research, ACNP
 2016  Léo-Pariseau Prize, Acfas
 2016  Distinguished Investigator Award, NARSAD
 2019 Margolese National Brain Disorders Prize, University of British Columbia
 2020 Sumitomo/Sunovion Brain Health Clinical Research Award, CINP
 2020 Colvin Prize in Mood Disorders Research, Brain & Behavior Research Foundation

Selected publications

Neurobiology studies

Clinical and behavioural studies of depression and suicide

References

External links 
 MGSS
 Douglas Research Centre
 PubMed Search
 Google Scholar Profile

1965 births
Living people
Canadian psychiatrists
Academic staff of McGill University
McGill University alumni
Canadian geneticists
Physicians from Montreal
Scientists from Montreal